John Man (1512–1569) was an English churchman, college head, and a diplomat.

Life
He was born at Lacock or Winterbourne Stoke, in Wiltshire. He was educated at Winchester College from 1523, and New College, Oxford, where he graduated B.A. in 1533, and M.A. in 1537, and became a Fellow. Under suspicion of heresy, he was expelled; but became the principal of White Hall, Oxford in 1547.

In 1562 he was appointed Warden of Merton College, Oxford, by the influence of Archbishop Matthew Parker. He became Dean of Gloucester in 1566. In 1567 he was sent by Elizabeth I as her ambassador to Madrid; the mission was unsuccessful and he was recalled in 1568.
Dr. John Man was a Protestant cleric, who called the pope in public a canting little monk.
Some sources maintain he was expelled by Philip II.

Works
He published Common places of Christian Religion (1563), based on Wolfgang Musculus.

Further reading
Gary M. Bell, "John Man: The Last Elizabethan Resident Ambassador in Spain", Sixteenth Century Journal, 7/2 (1976): 75-93

Notes

1512 births
1569 deaths
People from Wiltshire
People educated at Winchester College
Alumni of New College, Oxford
Fellows of New College, Oxford
Wardens of Merton College, Oxford
Deans of Gloucester
Ambassadors of England to Spain
16th-century English Anglican priests
16th-century English diplomats